The Pleasure Garden may refer to:

The Pleasure Garden (1925 film), a British silent film directed by Alfred Hitchcock
The Pleasure Garden (1953 film), a short film written and directed by James Broughton
The Pleasure Garden (1961 film), a  Swedish film directed by Alf Kjellin

See also
Pleasure garden, a park or garden open to the public for recreation and entertainment
Pleasure Gardens Theatre, a theatre in Folkestone, Kent, UK, 1886–1964